Damitha Turlin Fernando (born 18 September 1948 – died 27 November 2015 as දමිතා සළුවඩන) [Sinhala]), popularly as Damitha Saluwadana, was an actress in Sri Lankan cinema, stage drama and television. She played "Asilin" in the television serial Kopi Kade. She had acted in more than 300 stage plays, 200 television serials and 25 films.

Personal life
She was born on 18 September 1948 as the youngest child in a family with five siblings. She completed education from Karagampitiya Methodist School. Her elder sister's husband, Don Sirisena was a popular comedian in early Sinhala cinema. She was married to Wasantha Saluwadana and the couple had one daughter, Venushka. Venushka is married to Amila Prasad Silva. Damitha's cousin son Chanaka Fernando is also an actor.

Saluwadana suffered from diabetes for 29 years. When her diabetes was controlled by medication, her kidneys had unknowingly been a side effect. She died on 27 November 2015 at the age of 67. Her remains were kept in Boralesgamuwa Florists in Boralesgamuwa on 28 November 2015. Funeral took place on Thumbowila burial grounds.

Career
At the age of 7 she started to study Manipuri, Kandyan and Low country at the school under Sirimathi Rasadari and Grayson Fernando. Her first stage play was Mulaawa produced by her elder brother, Cyril Fernando. Later, she was seen in the cast of King Elara in a drama by the Tower Hall Foundation.

In 1966, she made debut cinema acting through the film Hangi Hora under the guidance of Rohini Jayakody at the age of 18 under the guidance of cousin Don Sirisena. Then in 1968, she started to act in stage plays Dasa Dahasak and Raththaran. She later joined the Wallis drama group and was a frequent actor in the Vesak dramas. During this period, she started to act in the plays Apuru Yaluwo and Yakada Sapaththu.

Later, Saluwadana has acted in many popular stage plays including, Siwamma Dhanapala, Sergeant Nallathambi, Baba Nona and Baisage Wadiya. Her maiden television acting came through Sudda Hami directed by Chandraratne Mapitigama. Often she was portrayed as a mother or aunt in cinema as well as in television.

She rendered his voice as a dubbing artist in many popular television serials such as Shanthi, Swabhiman, Rosa Achchi and Sujatha Diyaniya. She joined with Kopi Kade television serial in 1997. Her role as "Asilin" became highly popularized among the public and she was usually known by her character name rather than real name. She continued to act in the serial for 13 consecutive years until her death.

Selected television serials
 Denuwara Manike 
 Diriya Doni
 Ethuma
 Hiru Kumari
 Hoduwawa 
 Kadulla
 Keetaya
 Isuru Sangramaya
 Kopi Kade
 Neela Palingu Diya
 Nonavaruni Mahathvaruni
 Paalama
 Pabalu
 Sabanda Babanis
 Sara
 Subha Prabha
 Sundara Pemanis

Filmography

References

External links
 දමිතා සළුවඩන දැයෙන් සමුගනී
 Veteran Actress Damitha Saluwadana Passes Away
 Seven Iconic Teledramas In Sri Lanka’s Television History
 දමිතා සළුවඩන නික්ම යයි
 "කෝපි කඩේ" ටෙලි නාට්‍ය මාලාව: ශිල්පීන් ඇගයීම
 හිටපු ජනපති දමිතා සළුවඩන මහත්මියගේ දේහයට අවසන් ගරු බුහුමන් දක්වයි
 සිනහව ගෙන දී අපෙන් සමුගෙන ගිය කලාකරුවෝ
 කෝපි කඩේට තිස් වසරයි

Sri Lankan film actresses
Sinhalese actresses
1948 births
2015 deaths